Hendrick de Meijer (1620 – 1689), was a Dutch Golden Age landscape painter.

Biography
He was born in Rotterdam and is considered by the RKD to be a landscape painter of the "Albert Cuyp school". He is not to be confused with the later landscape painter Hendrik de Meijer who traveled to England.
He is known for dated works and is mentioned in Rotterdam archives from 1640 to 1689, but after that nothing more is known of him.

References

Hendrick de Meijer on Artnet

1620 births
1689 deaths
Dutch Golden Age painters
Dutch male painters
Painters from Rotterdam